North Story is an album by Ukrainian pianist Misha Alperin recorded in 1995 and released on the ECM label.

Reception
The Allmusic review by David R. Adler awarded the album 4 stars calling it a "set of mysterious original compositions... Combining Russian folk, modern classical, and free jazz influences".

Track listing
All compositions by Mikhail Alperin except as indicated
 "Morning" - 6:39 
 "Psalm No. 1" - 7:34 
 "Ironical Evening" - 8:06 
 "Alone" - 4:42 
 "Afternoon" - 9:22 
 "Psalm No. 2" - 6:59 
 "North Story" - 5:27 
 "Etude" - 6:35 
 "Kristi-Blodsdråper (Fucsia)" (Harald Sæverud) - 4:35 
Recorded at Rainbow Studio in Oslo, Norway in September 1995.

Personnel
Mikhail Alperin — piano
Arkady Shilkloper — French horn, fluegelhorn
Tore Brunborg — tenor saxophone
Terje Gewelt — double bass
Jon Christensen — drums

References

ECM Records albums
Mikhail Alperin albums
1996 albums
Albums produced by Manfred Eicher